Billroth II, more formally Billroth's operation II, is an operation in which a partial gastrectomy (removal of the stomach) is performed and the cut end of the stomach is closed.  The  greater curvature of the stomach (not involved with the previous closure of the stomach) is then connected to the first part of the jejunum in end-to-side anastomosis.  The Billroth II always follows resection of the lower part of the stomach (antrum). The surgical procedure is called a partial gastrectomy and gastrojejunostomy.
The Billroth II is often indicated in refractory peptic ulcer disease and gastric adenocarcinoma. 

Over the years, the Billroth II operation has been colloquially referred to as any partial removal of the stomach with an end to side connection to the stomach as shown in the picture; however, technically, this picture is a modification of Billroth's operation called a partial gastrectomy with a Kronelein anastomosis where the divided end of the stomach is directly anastomosed to the side of the jejunal loop. 

Von Hacker was the first person to refer to the Billroth II partial gastrectomy operation writing from Billroth's clinic in 1885.

See also
 Billroth I
 Roux-en-Y

References

External links
 [https://www.slideshare.net/bashirbnyunus/gastrectomy-132302683.

Digestive system surgery